Quadrophenia may refer to:

Quadrophenia, the album by the Who:
"Quadrophenia", the title track from the Quadrophenia album
Quadrophenia (film), the 1979 film based on the rock opera
Quadrophenia (soundtrack), the soundtrack from the 1979 film
Tommy and Quadrophenia Live, a DVD from The Who's 1989 and 1996-97 tours released in 2005
Quadrophenia (musical), a stage musical based on the rock opera

See also
Quadrophonia, a Dutch/Belgian musical group
Quadraphonic sound